Perimangelia nitens is a species of sea snail, a marine gastropod mollusk in the family Mangeliidae.

Description
The shell is similar to Clathromangelia variegata (Carpenter, 1864), but it has a chestnut and a white band.

Distribution
This marine species occurs off Northwest USA, from Monterey, California, to Magdalena Bay, Lower California

References

 Carpenter P. (1872) The Mollusks of Western North America, Smithsonian Institution, Washington  
 McLean J. H. (2000). Four new genera for northeastern Pacific gastropods. The Nautilus. 114: 99-102

External links
 

nitens
Gastropods described in 1864